The Women's road race at the 2008 World University Cycling Championship took place on 25 May 2008 in Nijmegen, Netherlands. The race was 96.3 km long.

Ellen van Dijk, who won the title in 2006 (and was still a student) did not defend her title.

Final classification

Source

References

External links

International University Sports Federation – Cycling

World University Cycling Championships
2008 in women's road cycling
Cycling